A maiden is a female virgin.

Maiden or Maidens may also refer to:

Meaning "first"

 Maiden flight, the first flight by an aircraft
 Maiden name, the family name carried by a woman before marriage
 Maiden over, in the sport of cricket, an over in which no runs are scored
 Maiden race, the first race for a horse
 Maiden race horse, a race horse that has yet to win a race
 Maiden speech, the first speech made by a politician in a formal assembly

Arts, entertainment, and media
 Iron Maiden, British heavy metal band, often shortened to "Maiden"
 Maiden, the first of the three aspects of the Triple Goddess (Neopaganism)
 Maiden, the author abbreviation for Joseph Maiden
 MaiDen, the alternative name of the fictional supercouple AlDub on a Philippine TV show
 Maiden (film), a documentary film by Alex Holmes
 Maiden, survival horror short video game made as a demo for Resident Evil Village

People with the surname
 David Maiden, Scottish rugby league player
 Gregor Maiden (born 1979), Scottish cricketer
 Jennifer Maiden (born 1949), Australian poet and novelist
 Joe Maiden, author and BBC Radio presenter
 Joseph Maiden (1859–1925), English/Australian botanist  
 Michael Maidens (1987–2007), English footballer
 Sidney Maiden (1917–c.1987), American country blues musician 
 Willie Maiden (1928–1976), American jazz saxophonist and arranger

Places
 Maiden Castle (disambiguation)

United Kingdom
 Maiden Bradley, Wiltshire
 Maiden Island, Oban Bay, Scotland
 Maiden Law, Durham, England
 Maiden Moor, in the Lake District of England
 Maiden Newton, Dorset
 Maiden Stack, Shetland
 Maiden Stone, Pictish standing stone near Inverurie, Scotland
 Maiden Wells, Pembrokeshire
 Maidens, South Ayrshire, Scotland
 Maiden's Green, Berkshire
 The Maidens, Northern Ireland

United States
 Maiden, North Carolina, in Catawba County
 Maiden Creek, a tributary of the Schuylkill River, Pennsylvania
 Maiden Rock, Wisconsin
 Maidens, Virginia

Other uses
 Maiden (guillotine), a device used for executions
 Maiden (yacht), an ocean racing yacht 
 Maiden Holdings, a Bermuda insurance holding company
 Maiden rocksnail (Leptoxis formosa), an extinct freshwater snail species

See also
 
 
 Bal maiden
 Crystal Maiden, an archaeological object
 Euromaidan, a Ukrainian protest and riot movement
 Iron maiden (disambiguation)
 Maidan (disambiguation)
 Maiden Lane (disambiguation)
 Maiden's hair (disambiguation)
 Maidenhead (disambiguation)
 Rozen Maiden, a manga and anime series
 The Dragon Chronicles – The Maidens, 1994 Hong Kong film